SEGA Rally Championship is a 1994 racing video game developed by Sega AM3 and published by Sega. Originally released for arcades using the Sega Model 2 board, it was converted to the Sega Saturn in 1995 and Windows in 1997. The unique selling point of Sega Rally Championship was the ability to drive on different surfaces, with different friction properties, with the car's handling changing accordingly.  As the first racing game to incorporate this feature, Sega Rally Championship is considered to be one of the milestones in the evolution of the racing game genre. It was also an early rally racing game and featured cooperative gameplay alongside the usual competitive multiplayer.

The music for the arcade game was composed by Takenobu Mitsuyoshi, while the Sega Saturn version's soundtrack consisted of a combination of newly composed music by Naofumi Hataya and arrangements of the arcade originals arranged and produced by Takayuki Hijikata previously released on the album Sega Rally Championship Ignition. The game spawned the Sega Rally series, in addition to inspiring Colin McRae Rally (1998).

Gameplay
The player can enter a "World Championship" mode consisting of three stages: Desert (which resembles African savanna), Forest (which is based on Yosemite National Park) and Mountain (which is in Corsica), where their finishing position at the end of one course is carried through to the starting position of the next course. In this mode, it is impossible to reach first-place position by the end of the first track; thus, the player must try to overtake as many opponent cars as possible on each track (while staying within the time limit), and gain the lead over several tracks. If, at the end of the third round, the player is in first place, they are able to play a fourth secret circuit called "Lakeside" (on the Saturn version, this course may then be played in time attack and split-screen multiplayer modes).

Three cars are featured in the game; Didier Auriol's third generation Toyota Celica GT-Four and Juha Kankkunen's Lancia Delta HF Integrale which are both available from the start, and Sandro Munari's Lancia Stratos HF which is unlocked by finishing Lakeside in first place in home versions of the game, or by use of an easter egg in the arcade version.  Players are given the option to drive each car in either manual or automatic transmission.

The game supports up to four players using cabinets linked together.

Development

Sega Rally Championship was directed by Kenji Sasaki, a former Namco employee known for his work on Ridge Racer. Seeking to develop a racing game that was distinct from the popular arcade titles Ridge Racer and Daytona USA, Sasaki chose the rally racing subgenre, which he felt was "taboo" in the Japanese gaming community: "We were after something in vogue in terms of motorsport racing and as we were keen on great engine sounds, cool cars and great sensations—the obvious choice was rally". While the game featured only three cars—the Toyota Celica GT-Four, Lancia Delta Group A, and a hidden Lancia Stratos—it was distinguished by its "stylized handling" and some tuning options. Asked why the developers chose to use the Celica and Delta, team manager Hiroto Kikuchi answered: "We felt that in the rally, we had to use real rally cars and the chosen vehicles were well known and looked good". Senior programmer Riyuchi Hattori added: "Originally there was talk of using another car from Toyota, but we couldn't find a good one. For example, the Supra would have been just the same as the Celica and not much fun to use in the game, so we ended up with just the one. We also took note of the consumers' opinions, which confirmed that if another car was to be added it should be the Stratos". According to game designer Tetsuya Mizuguchi, they had no experience in driving those cars, but after repeated requests Toyota and Fiat provided feedback for game testing. Fiat also made a gentlemen's agreement with the developers allowing the use of official logos and such in Sega Rally Championship; there was no formal sponsorship deal for the game. Mizuguchi's car was used to produce the in-game sound of the Lancia Delta's engine. While developing the game's visual style, the development team spent three weeks driving from the West Coast of the United States to Mexico, taking photographs for use in texture mapping. At one point, Sasaki became deeply worried about Rally's prospects for success, and even began to question why driving cars was considered "fun": "I drove up into the mountains with my own car. It was such an enjoyable and exhilarating experience ... This was how the third mountain track in the game was conceived".

The Saturn version of the game had to be almost completely remade, only referencing the graphics of the arcade version, which required detailed planning. Mizguchi recounted: "Our designers went back to the arcade version and worked out the locations, drew pictures and captured the atmosphere and the feeling of distance. Then there was about two weeks discussion on their work. During this time they worked on the car settings and we had Mr. Yoshio Fujimoto, winner in the Toyota Castrol car to advise it. Then Mr. Nakamura, Mr. Hattori, and Mr. Fujimoto went to the Asian Pacific Indonesian Rally for three days and studied the cars". Aside from Mizuguchi producing both projects, the Saturn development team was completely different from the original arcade team. Unlike other well-received arcade conversions for the Saturn such as Virtua Fighter 2 and Virtua Cop, Sega Rally Championship was developed without using the Sega Graphics Library operating system, as it had not yet been completed when work on the game began. For similar reasons, a split screen was used for multiplayer mode instead of the Saturn link cable; the developers also felt it was important that multiplayer be available to all owners of the Saturn game, not only those who had also purchased a link cable. Finally, the arcade version of Rally was designed to be controlled with a steering wheel, and the developers struggled to simulate its drifting techniques using the Saturn's controller. The game also supports the Saturn Steering Wheel, though it lacks the haptic feedback of the arcade version's steering wheel.

The Saturn version was rushed to the North American market in order to take advantage of the Christmas shopping season. By the time of its release in Japan and Europe, the development team had completed several additional graphical improvements, bug fixes, and front-end options. A version was also released for the  Netlink that allowed online play.

Release
In Japan, the Saturn version of the game shared the full title of its arcade counterpart, Sega Rally Championship 1995, because it was released on December 29, 1995; the year was dropped from the title of the North American and European Saturn version. The European release was scheduled for December 1995, in time for the crucial Christmas shopping season, but it did not appear until the end of the following January.

Reception and legacy

Arcade
Upon release, the game sold 12,000 arcade units. In Japan, Game Machine listed it on their April 1, 1995 issue as being the second most-successful dedicated arcade game of the month. It went on to be the second highest-grossing dedicated arcade game of 1995 in Japan. In the United States, it was one of the top six best-selling arcade games of 1995, receiving the Platinum Award from the American Amusement Machine Association (AAMA).

The arcade game was met with positive reviews from critics. Next Generation reviewed the arcade version of the game, stating that "Rally's downside is the car's indestructibility: no matter how much you slam into either opponents or banks, your racer [...] receives not a scratch, nor can you flip or leave the road [...] And some might say the control is a fault, too; our response? Keep practicing, buddy".

Home conversions
Upon its Saturn home console release, the game sold 1.2 million copies.

The Saturn version was met with almost universally positive reviews. Next Generation praised the Saturn version's "down-and-dirty feel", "truly phenomenal high-speed visuals", and "quick, responsive control". The magazine cited the game's physics and handling as "nothing short of remarkable". Game Informers Reiner and Andy gave Sega Rally Championship scores of 8/10 and 8.5/10, making note of technical improvements over the Saturn version of Sega's Daytona USA, which Andy nonetheless felt was the better game. Game Informers Paul was more effusive, rating the Saturn port 9.25/10 for its "far better racing feel" and superior graphics to Daytona. Sega Saturn Magazine praised the difficulty of unlocking the secret course and secret car, and remarking that "whilst there's enough drag, slide action and difficulty wrestling with the controls to convince you the programmers know what it's like to drive a rally car, there's never so much realism that you'd have to know how to drive one yourself to play the game". Later, Sega Saturn Magazine would rank the game as the second best game on the platform, saying "two years on its release and Sega Rally is still the best racer on a console bar none".

Both of the sports reviewers for Electronic Gaming Monthly gave the Saturn version an 8.5 out of 10, saying it "has all of the action and adventure of its arcade cousin. If you were disappointed with Daytona, you won't be with Sega Rally". Bruised Lee of GamePro praised the additional features of the Saturn version and technical improvements over Daytona USA, but criticized that the sounds, while identical to the arcade version, are unexciting compared to other racing games. He said that the power-slide technique can be initially frustrating but once mastered is "effective and fun". Maximum decreed the conversion to be "every bit as good as anyone could have ever hoped", stating that aside from the frame rate being reduced to 30 frames per second, it is essentially identical to the arcade version. They also complimented the inclusion of a two-player mode, numerous options, and secret modes. The Saturn port was another major system-seller for the system in the United Kingdom, becoming the fastest selling CD game at the time.

The Windows version was less well received. Critics generally commented that the fun gameplay is still wholly intact, but that the conversion lacks many features standard to PC racing games and suffers from mediocre frame rates except when playing in low-resolution mode, in which case it instead suffers from having lower detail and more pixelation than the Saturn version. Mark Clarkson of Computer Gaming World found the biggest problem was that, being a port of an arcade game, it lacks the longevity expected of a PC game, though he judged it to be fun while it lasted. Next Generation concluded that those looking specifically to play Sega Rally Championship on PC would find the version sufficient, but that there were better PC racers available. GameSpots Stephen Poole opined that the content of the game was "just not enough".

Accolades
In 1996, Next Generation listed it as number 57 on their "Top 100 Games of All Time", citing the "heavier", more realistic feel of the car when compared to other racing games, and the generally realistic controls. In 1996, GamesMaster ranked the game number 1 on their "The GamesMaster Saturn Top 10". In the same issue, they also rated the game 24th in its "Top 100 Games of All Time". In 1999, Next Generation listed Sega Rally as number 19 on their "Top 50 Games of All Time", commenting that, "one of the best Model 2 games, Sega Rally is some of the best fun you can have in a car without having to pretend that you've run out of gas". Sega Rally Championship was named the best racing game of all time by Retro Gamer magazine, which ranked it at the top of its "Top 25 Racing Games Ever" list. In Guinness World Records: Gamer's Edition 2009 the Saturn version of the game made it to 44th position in the list of the Top 50 Console Games, due to its "distinct handling style and superb track design". IGN staff writer Levi Buchanan ranked Sega Rally Championship 6th in his list of the top 10 Sega Saturn games, saying: "Yes, the Dreamcast version is much better and the current-gen sequel... is stunning, but this Saturn arcade port was one of the top reasons to stick by SEGA as it flailed through the 32-bit days". Some publications and fan-voted lists have considered it to be one of the best games of all time, including Next Generation in 1996, or Electronic Gaming Monthly in 1997, Computer and Video Games in 2000, Edge in 2007, and NowGamer in 2010.

Impact
The game spawned the Sega Rally series, and later followed spiritually by Initial D Arcade Stage from the same company, based on the Initial D comics and featuring base models of certain rally cars.

In 2010, Codemasters cited Sega Rally Championship as a strong influence on their first Colin McRae Rally game (1998). According to Guy Wilday, producer of the first four Colin McRae Rally games, the "basic premise for the game was based around" Sega Rallys car handling which "remains excellent to this day and it’s still an arcade machine I enjoy playing".

References

External links
 Official website via Internet Archive
 Sega Rally Championship at the Killer List of Videogames
 Sega Rally Championship at MobyGames

1994 video games
Arcade video games
Game Boy Advance games
N-Gage games
Sega-AM3 games
Sega arcade games
Sega Rosso games
Sega Saturn games
Sega video games
Off-road racing video games
Rally racing video games
Split-screen multiplayer games
Video games scored by Takenobu Mitsuyoshi
Windows games
Video games developed in Japan
Multiplayer and single-player video games

pl:Sega Rally